DeKalb is a city in DeKalb County, Illinois, United States. The population was 40,290 at the 2020 census, down from 43,862 at the 2010 census. The city is named after decorated Franconian-French war hero Johann de Kalb, who died during the American Revolutionary War.

Founded in 1856, DeKalb became important in the development and manufacture of barbed wire, especially for agriculture and raising livestock. While agricultural-related industries remain a facet of the city, along with health and services, the city's largest employer in the 21st century is Northern Illinois University, founded in 1895.

History
DeKalb was originally called Huntley's Grove, and under the latter name was platted in 1853. The name is for Baron Johann de Kalb, a major general in the American Revolutionary War. The first church in DeKalb was organized in 1844. Beginning in 1846, a stage coach traveled from Chicago through DeKalb and Dixon to Galena. A post office has been in operation at DeKalb since 1849. The first railroad reached DeKalb in 1853.

Barbed wire was a key product in DeKalb's history. Joseph Glidden (1813-1906), a DeKalb resident since about 1850, received a patent in 1874 for inventing the conventional double-strand barbed wire that remains in common use around the world today. Glidden and Isaac L. Ellwood (1833-1910) manufactured barbed wire in DeKalb, initially as the Barb Fence Company. Successor companies included the 1881 Superior Barbed Wire Company, which merged into American Steel and Wire in 1898 and finally became United States Steel. Between 1892 and 1898 Glidden and Ellwood played substantial parts in establishing the state teachers college that became Northern Illinois University.

DeKalb played a leading role in the development of commercial hybrid corn. From a base in the early county Farm Bureau, the DeKalb Agricultural Association produced large quantities of high-yield seed varieties, beginning in 1934. Until the mid-1970s, more American farmers planted DeKalb hybrid corn than any other brand. The DeKalb logo was a flying ear of corn. A series of joint ventures and mergers beginning in 1982 resulted in the DeKalb brand of agricultural products being owned by Bayer since 2017.

Geography
The South Branch Kishwaukee River flows northward through DeKalb.

This was only the second time the river has risen above  since the level of the river has been recorded.

Climate
DeKalb has a humid continental climate (Köppen climate classification Dfa) typical of northern Illinois, with four distinct seasons. Summers can be hot, while winters are cold and snowy. Precipitation is somewhat uniform year-round, although it can be heavier in the spring and summer when the area is prone to strong thunderstorms.

Demographics
As of the 2020 census there were 40,290 people, 15,839 households, and 7,804 families residing in the city. The racial makeup of the city was 58.73% White, 18.48% African American, 0.76% Native American, 3.92% Asian, 0.04% Pacific Islander, 7.99% from other races, and 10.08% from two or more races. Hispanic or Latino of any race were 17.83% of the population.

There were 15,839 households, out of which 44.79% had children under the age of 18 living with them, 32.03% were married couples living together, 13.14% had a female householder with no husband present, and 50.73% were non-families. 34.52% of all households were made up of individuals, and 7.78% had someone living alone who was 65 years of age or older. The average household size was 3.22 and the average family size was 2.45.

The city's age distribution consisted of 17.9% under the age of 18, 31.8% from 18 to 24, 24% from 25 to 44, 17.2% from 45 to 64, and 9.1% who were 65 years of age or older. The median age was 25.1 years. For every 100 females, there were 97.5 males. For every 100 females age 18 and over, there were 99.8 males.

The median income for a household in the city was $44,223, and the median income for a family was $67,155. Males had a median income of $32,306 versus $17,703 for females. The per capita income for the city was $24,819. About 17.8% of families and 26.4% of the population were below the poverty line, including 34.8% of those under age 18 and 6.6% of those age 65 or over.

Culture and contemporary life 
 DeKalb is home to the annual Corn Fest, usually held in late August.
 The Egyptian Theatre, built in 1929, is one of a handful of such theatres still extant in the United States.
 The Stage Coach Players, founded in 1947, have a theatre on 5th Street.

Economy
DeKalb is home to Northern Illinois University, the city's largest employer and Illinois's third-largest campus. Other large employers include Northwestern Medicine, General Electric, Monsanto (originally as DeKalb Corn), the local school district, and a large retail district along Route 23 (shared with Sycamore) that includes Walmart, Target, Lowe's, Best Buy, Meijer, Kohl's, Ross, and dozens of other chain and local stores.

DeKalb is also home to warehouses for several major companies, including Target, 3M, Nestlé, and Ferrara Candy Company, in part due to DeKalb's proximity to major highways such as I-88 and I-39. 3M's complex serves as the distribution hub for three of 3M's four business units and export operations to North America, Europe, Africa, the Middle East and Latin America.

In 1984, the intersection of two streets in a popular NIU housing district in DeKalb begot the name of a regional consulting firm, "Greenbrier & Russel" (subsequently acquired by Fujitsu Consulting in 2006). In 2011, DeKalb was the broadcast base of Up and In: The Baseball Prospectus Podcast with Kevin Goldstein and Jason Parks. The town was also the filming location for the 2012 film At Any Price.

In June, 2020, Meta announced it would construct an $800 million data center on the south side of DeKalb.

Parks and greenspace

The DeKalb Park District is responsible for DeKalb's 44 parks and recreation facilities. Members of the League of Women Voters established the park district in 1935 to address the need for a public swimming pool. The City of DeKalb gave the first four parks to the District: Annie's Woods, Huntley Park, Liberty Park, and Hopkins Park.

In 2000 the district opened the Sports and Recreation Center, a multi-function facility that features an indoor field of over 1 acre, clear-span space with synthetic field turf. The park district provides year-round athletic and recreation programs including day camps, youth baseball and softball, adult softball leagues both indoors and outdoors, swimming lessons, golf lessons, karate, tennis, adult and youth basketball leagues, indoor soccer, fitness classes, and preschool.

The DeKalb Park District park system has 44 parks totaling over 700 acres: community parks, neighborhood parks, passive parks and linear parks. Notable parks and facilities include:
River Heights Golf Course
Buena Vista Golf Course
Hopkins Park Pool and Community Center
Nehring Center for Culture and Tourism
Ellwood House Museum and Park

Government
DeKalb has a council-manager government.  Policy is developed by an elected city council and implemented by an appointed professional city manager. The DeKalb City Council is made up of a mayor, elected at-large, and seven alderpersons, elected by ward. Each serves a four-year term, with half the council elected every two years. A city clerk is also elected every four years to serve as the city's official recordkeeper. City council meetings are held the second and fourth Mondays of every month.

Education
There are 11 public schools, one private school, one university and one public library.

Northern Illinois University

Northern Illinois University (NIU) was founded in DeKalb as the Northern Illinois State Normal School in 1895. NIU is a comprehensive teaching and research institution with total enrollment around 20,000 (including about 16,000 undergraduates and 300 law school students), which makes NIU the third largest campus in Illinois. NIU is home of the Huskies. Notable NIU alumni include Dan Castellaneta (the voice of Homer Simpson and Krusty the Clown), Jimmy Chamberlin (The Smashing Pumpkins drummer), former U.S. House Speaker Dennis Hastert, former Labor Secretary W. Willard Wirtz, Oscar-nominated actress Joan Allen in Pleasantville (film), NFL players Michael Turner, Doug Free, Chandler Harnish, Jordan Lynch and Ryan Diem, former NBA Players Kenny Battle and Paul Dawkins, and actor Steve Harris from David E. Kelley's legal Drama The Practice.

Public schools
DeKalb is served by both public and private school systems. DeKalb Community Unit School District 428 operates eight elementary schools (Grades K-5), Clinton Rosette and Huntley Middle Schools (Grades 6-8), and DeKalb High School (Grades 9-12), which is the home of the Barbs.

Infrastructure

Transportation

Railway
The first railroad entered DeKalb on August 22, 1853. In 1864, the line became part of the Chicago and North Western Railway main line from Chicago to Omaha, which carried passengers until 1971. A depot between 6th and 7th Streets was built in 1891. The Union Pacific Railroad took control of the line in 1995. In January 2023, the Dekalb City Council voted to fund a transportation study aimed at determining feasibility of extending Metra Union Pacific West Line commuter rail service from Elburn to the city.

Road
The transcontinental Lincoln Highway was established through DeKalb in 1913. The first "seedling mile" of concrete pavement was built in 1914 at Malta, six miles west of DeKalb. The rest of Lincoln Highway across DeKalb County was paved in 1920. The highway is now part of Illinois Route 38. The main north-south highway through DeKalb is Illinois Route 23, which forms an unusual intersection of two state highways and a major railroad at the corner of Fourth and Lincoln. Interstate Highway 88, part of the Illinois Tollway system, was completed to DeKalb around 1975 and passes just south of town, where there are two toll plazas and a service oasis that includes restaurants and a gas station.

Bus
Scheduled local bus service throughout the DeKalb area is provided by DeKalb Public Transit, a joint effort by the city in partnership with Northern Illinois University. Routes extend through the university, the city, and Sycamore with extensions west to Kishwaukee College and east to the passenger rail station at Elburn. Schedules on the main routes vary depending on whether the university is in session. The system began in 1971 as the Huskie Bus Line under contract to the NIU Student Association. By 1982 the system served 3 million riders per year, second only in Illinois to the Chicago Transit Authority. In 2018, it merged with a smaller City of DeKalb bus system, which had been operated by the local Voluntary Action Center (VAC). Paratransit operations were added in 2021, also by transfer from VAC. VAC continues to serve a wider surrounding area with on-demand transportation for people with special needs and to out-of-town medical appointments.

Airport
DeKalb Taylor Municipal Airport (DTMA) , serving the general aviation community, is on the east side of the city at 3232 Pleasant Street. The airport opened in April 1944 in association with a factory making Interstate TDR assault drone aircraft. The city took ownership in 1948. There is no commercial service directly to DeKalb, but the city center is 43.43 miles away from O'Hare International Airport in Chicago, making commercial air access relatively easy.

Hospitals 
 Northwestern Medicine Kishwaukee Hospital

Notable people 

 George Franklin Barber, architect, known as one of the most successful American domestic architects of the late Victorian period. He was born in DeKalb.
 A. J. Bramlett, former professional basketball player for the Cleveland Cavaliers.
 Dennis J. Collins, Illinois lawyer and state legislator
 Cindy Crawford, model and actress, appeared on hundreds of magazine covers throughout her career and in 1995 was named the world's highest-paid model by Forbes. She was born and raised in DeKalb.
 Joseph B. Ebbesen, optometrist and Illinois state legislator.
 Isaac L. Ellwood, rancher, businessman and barbed wire entrepreneur.
 Philip Ewell, American professor of music theory at Hunter College and the CUNY Graduate Center.
 Fred Eychaner, media mogul and philanthropist. He was raised in DeKalb.
 Joseph Glidden, farmer who patented barbed wire in 1874, which changed the development of the American West.
 Jacob Haish, one of the inventors of barbed wire.
 Barbara Hale, film actress and Emmy Award-winning co-star of Perry Mason television series.
 Mike Heimerdinger, assistant coach for several NFL teams including the Denver Broncos and Tennessee Titans. He was born and raised in DeKalb.
 Richard Jenkins, actor, nominated for the Academy Award for Best Actor and Best Supporting Actor for his performances in The Visitor (2007) and The Shape of Water (2017) respectively. He was born and raised in DeKalb.
 Alan and Dale Klapmeier, co-founders of the Cirrus Design Corporation and 2014 inductees into the National Aviation Hall of Fame. They were raised in DeKalb and graduated from DeKalb High School.
 Doug Mallory, former coach of the Atlanta Falcons. He attended DeKalb High School while his father was coach of the Northern Illinois Huskies.
 Karl Nelson, offensive tackle for the New York Giants. He played football for the DeKalb High School Barbs.
 Mel Owens, linebacker for the Los Angeles Rams from 1981 to 1989. He played football for the DeKalb High School Barbs.
 Richard Powers, author and winner of the 2006 National Book Award for Fiction for The Echo Maker.
 Hellah Sidibe, former professional soccer player and the first black person to run across the United States.
 Weekend Nachos, powerviolence punk band. They were formed in DeKalb.
 Sue Vicory, writer, film producer and filmmaker
 W. Willard Wirtz, United States Secretary of Labor during the Kennedy administration and Johnson administration. He was born and raised in DeKalb where his home is preserved on the campus of Northern Illinois University.

See also

Haish Memorial Library
Kishwaukee River
Northern Illinois University
Northern Illinois University shooting

References

External links

Official Website
DeKalb Chamber of Commerce

 
Cities in Illinois
Populated places established in 1837
Cities in DeKalb County, Illinois
Cities in the Chicago metropolitan area